The Union of Trade Unions of Chad (UST) is a trade union centre in Chad. It was formed originally in 1988 as the National Union of Chadian Workers (UNST). The UNST was dissolved briefly in 1990 and reemerged as the UST.

The UST is affiliated with the International Trade Union Confederation.

References

Trade unions in Chad
International Trade Union Confederation
1991 establishments in Chad
Trade unions established in 1991